The Nissan Present the 39th Annual 12 Hours of Sebring International Grand Prix of Endurance, was the third round of both the 1991 Camel GT Championship and Exxon Supreme GT Series and was held at the Sebring International Raceway, on 16 March.

Report

Entry
A total of 54 cars were entered for the event, across four classes ranging through GTO /GTU up to GTP. Of these 51 cars practised.

Qualifying
The Nissan NPT-90 of Geoff Brabham, partnered by Derek Daly and his younger brother, Gary Brabham took pole position. They were joined on the front row by their Nissan Performance team-mates Chip Robinson, Bob Earl and Julian Bailey.

Race
In front of a crowd of approximately 80,000, the race was held over 12 Hours, on Sebring International Raceway. The race started in cool conditions, but finished wet. For most of the early running, the #6 Joest Racing Porsche 962C of Bob Wollek, Bernd Schnieder and Massimo Sigala lead. Apart from pit stops, this car lead until lap 80, when the pole winning Nissan took control of the race. The Brabham brothers and Daly would lead from lap 81 until their saw the flag on lap 298. In between, their team-mates (Robinson/Earl/Bailey) would lead a total of 41 laps, losing the lead for the last time, just six laps from home. 
During the race, there were seven full-course cautions covering 54 laps, lasting a total of 3 hours and 14 minutes. Despite this Brabham/Daly/Brabham took the winner spoils for Don Devendorf’s Nissan Performance Technology Inc. team. This partnership, driving their Nissan NPT-90, won in a time of 12hr 02:01.391mins., averaging a speed of 91.626 mph. They covered a distance of 1,102.6 miles. One lap adrift in second place was their fellow Nissan NPT-90 of Robinson/Earl/Bailey. Early front runners, Wolleck/Schnieder/Sigala brought their Porsche home at third just another lap further back. Another Porsche from Joest came home in fourth, driven by Frank Jelinski, Henri Pescarolo and ”John Winter”. The top Jaguar was fifth in the hands of Davy Jones, Raul Boesel and John Nielsen.

Classification

Sebring 12 hours

Class Winners are in Bold text.

 Fastest lap: Bob Wollek, 1:51.120secs. (120.57 mph)

Class Winners

References

IMSA GTP
12 Hours of Sebring
12 Hours of Sebring
Sebring
12 Hours of Sebring